The following is a list of episodes of the Canadian animated television series The Raccoons. The series began as TV specials broadcast between 1980 and 1983 and a direct-to-video special in 1984, before becoming a regular series in 1985.

Specials (1980–1984)
The Raccoons began life as three television specials and one direct-to-video special:

Regular series
Sixty episodes were broadcast between 1985 and 1991. All but three episode titles had exclamation marks at the end.

Season 1 (1985–1986)

Season 2 (1987)

Season 3 (1988)

Season 4 (1989)

Season 5 (1990–1991)

References
Episode summaries summarized from info at The Un-Official Raccoons Homepage: Episode Guide Index

Lists of Canadian children's animated television series episodes
The Raccoons